Fernando Cardoso dos Santos (born 20 November 1990), is a Brazilian professional footballer who currently plays for Erbil SC in Iraqi Premier League.

Honours
Novorizontino
Paulista A3: 2014

References

External links
 
 Fernando Cardoso at playmakerstats.com (English version of zerozero.pt and ogol.com.br)
 

1990 births
Living people
Brazilian footballers
Association football forwards
Puntarenas F.C. players
União São João Esporte Clube players
Grêmio Esportivo Novorizontino players
Najaf FC players
Naft Al-Wasat SC players
Erbil SC players
Liga FPD players
Brazilian expatriate footballers
Brazilian expatriate sportspeople in Costa Rica
Brazilian expatriate sportspeople in Iraq
Expatriate footballers in Costa Rica
Expatriate footballers in Iraq
Place of birth missing (living people)